This is a list of electoral results for the electoral district of Port Melbourne in Victorian state elections.

Members for Port Melbourne

Election results

Elections in the 1950s

Elections in the 1940s

 Preferences were not distributed.

Elections in the 1930s

Elections in the 1920s

Elections in the 1910s

 Two party preferred vote was estimated.

References

Victoria (Australia) state electoral results by district